Jean Ann Ewers (September 11, 1929 – August 27, 2011), known professionally as Eve Brent and Jean Lewis, was an American actress who portrayed Jane in Tarzan's Fight for Life.

Biography

Early years
Born as Jean Ann Ewers in Houston, Texas, in 1929, and raised in Fort Worth, she appeared on radio and television (guest-starring roles and hundreds of commercials), in movies, and on the theater stage.

Career
Some of her early film work includes roles in Gun Girls (1956), Journey to Freedom (1957), and Forty Guns (1957). She became the 12th actress to play Jane when she appeared opposite Gordon Scott's Tarzan in the film Tarzan's Fight for Life, (1958). She also played the role in Tarzan and the Trappers 1958, three episodes filmed as a pilot for a proposed Tarzan television series and subsequently edited together into a feature film when the series wasn't picked up. She also appeared in the "Girl on the Road" episode of The Veil, a short 1958 Boris Karloff TV series that was never aired but was found in the 1990s and released on DVD. Karloff both hosted and starred in her episode, which was scripted and directed by George Waggner.  In 1967, she appeared as Benjie Carver's mother in "The LSD Story" episode of the Dragnet television show.

Recognition
In 1980, she won a Saturn Award for Best Supporting Actress for her work in Fade to Black. In 1998, she appeared as the grandmother of a family gathered around the dinner table in a Christmas television commercial for Publix Super Markets. Her best-known recent work in films was in The Green Mile, 1999. She continued to work in episodic television, and made a guest appearance in Frasier (season one, episode three as the hostess), 2006 on an episode of Scrubs, and in 2010 on an episode of Community. She also appeared on Emergency! in 1974 as a lady whose daughter  had her toe stuck in the bathtub.

Widowhood
By her 40s, Brent had been married and divorced numerous times. Michael Ashe, her last husband died on July 31, 2008.

Death
Eve Brent died from natural causes, 15 days before her 82nd birthday, on August 27, 2011.

Partial filmography

Female Jungle (1955) - Monica Madison
The Storm Rider (1957) - Mrs. Cooper (uncredited)
The Garment Jungle (1957) - Receptionist (uncredited)
Journey to Freedom (1957) - Mary Raikin
Forty Guns (1957) - Louvenia Spanger
Gun Girls (1957) - Joy Jenkins
The Bride and the Beast (1958) - Stewardess
Tarzan's Fight for Life (1958) - Jane
The Sad Horse (1959) - Sheila
Cage of Evil (1960) - Officer Lucille Barron (uncredited)
Stakeout! (1962) - Susie
Mara of the Wilderness (1965) - Mrs. Wade
A Guide for the Married Man (1967) - Joe X's Blowsy Blonde
Coogan's Bluff (1968) - Hooker (uncredited)
The Happy Ending (1969) - Ethel
Airport (1970) - Mrs. David Corman - Passenger (uncredited)
Triangle (1970)
The Barefoot Executive (1971) - Mrs. Crampton
The Todd Killings (1971)
How's Your Love Life? (1971) - Mrs. Ryan
How to Seduce a Woman (1974) - Dr. Sister's Sister
Timber Tramps (1975) - Corey Sykes
The White Buffalo (1977) - Frieda
Fade to Black (1980) - Aunt Stella Binford
BrainWaves (1982) - Mrs. Simpson
Going Berserk (1983) - Mrs. Reese
Racing with the Moon (1984) - Mrs. Kaiser
Date with an Angel (1987) - Matron #1
The Experts (1989) - Aunt Thelma
The Green Mile (1999) - Elaine Connelly
Between Christmas and New Year's (2000) - May
Garfield: The Movie (2004) - Mrs. Baker
Palo Alto (2007) - Grandma
The Curious Case of Benjamin Button (2008) - Old Woman (uncredited)
The Hit List (2011) - Mrs. Sheehan
Ticket Out (2012) - Emma (final film role)

References

External links
 
 
 Tribute page

1929 births
2011 deaths
People from Fort Worth, Texas
Actresses from Houston
American film actresses
American television actresses
20th-century American actresses
21st-century American actresses